Graeme Powell (born 2 January 1947) is a New Zealand former cricketer. He played nineteen first-class and twelve List A matches for Otago between 1969 and 1978.

See also
 List of Otago representative cricketers

References

External links
 

1947 births
Living people
New Zealand cricketers
Otago cricketers
Cricketers from Dunedin